Swan Lake is a lake in Ballard County, Kentucky. At , it is the largest natural lake in Kentucky. It is part of a twelve-lake confederation known as Cummins Tract Lakes.

References

Bodies of water of Ballard County, Kentucky
Lakes of Kentucky